Javier Martínez Resendiz (born 19 August 1986) is a Mexican former professional boxer who competed from 2005 to 2017. He challenged for the WBC strawweight title in 2012 and at regional level held the WBC International Silver strawweight title in 2012.

References

External links
 

Boxers from Mexico City
Mini-flyweight boxers
1988 births
Living people
Mexican male boxers